The 1992–93 New Orleans Privateers men's basketball team represented the University of New Orleans during the 1992–93 NCAA Division I men's basketball season. The Privateers led by fifth-year head coach Tim Floyd, played their home games at Lakefront Arena and played as a member of the Sun Belt Conference. They finished the season 26–4 (18–0 Sun Belt), sweeping through the Sun Belt regular season. New Orleans lost in the championship game of the Sun Belt Conference tournament, but received a bid to the NCAA tournament as the No. 8 seed in the Midwest region. The Privateers would lose in the opening round to No. 9 seed Xavier, 73–55.

Roster

Schedule and results

|-
!colspan=9 style=| Regular season

|-
!colspan=9 style=| Sun Belt Conference tournament

|-
!colspan=9 style=| NCAA tournament

Rankings

Awards and honors
Ervin Johnson – Sun Belt Men's Player of the Year, Third-team All-American (UPI)
Tim Floyd – Sun Belt Coach of the Year

References

New Orleans Privateers men's basketball seasons
New Orleans
New Orleans
1992 in sports in Louisiana
1993 in sports in Louisiana